Canal+ Kuchnia  is a Polish television channel owned and operated by Canal+. Canal+ Kuchina broadcasts programming related to food and cooking.

See also
 Canal+ Domo
 Ale Kino+

References

External links
 Official website

Television channels in Poland
Television channels and stations established in 2006
Canal+ Premium